Clayson may refer to:

Surname
Alan Clayson (born 1951), singer-songwriter, music biographer, journalist, solo entertainer
Billy Clayson (1897–1973), English footballer
Esther Clayson or Esther Pohl Lovejoy (1869–1967), American physician, public-health pioneer, suffrage activist, congressional candidate
Oliver Clayson (born 1980), English cricketer
Percy Jack Clayson MC, DFC, a British Flying Ace in World War I credited with twenty-nine victories
William Clayson (1840–1887), Latter-day Saint hymnwriter born in England

Given name
Clayson Benally, member of Blackfire, a Navajo (Diné) traditionally-influenced musical group
Clayson Henrique da Silva Vieira (born 1995), Brazilian footballer
Clayson Queiroz (born 1978), Brazilian footballer
Jane Clayson Johnson, Emmy-winning journalist and author
Wayne Clayson Booth (1921–2005), American literary critic

Other
George Clayson House, restored Second Empire home built in 1873 in Palatine Road, Palatine, IL, USA

See also
Claesson
Clason (disambiguation)
Clauson
Clawson (disambiguation)
Claystone